Naima Khan is a Pakistani actress. She is known for her roles in dramas Tum Mere Kya Ho, Saya-e-Dewar Bhi Nahi, Shehnai, Yaqeen Ka Safar and Yeh Dil Mera.

Early life
Naima was born in 1972 on October 26th in Lahore. She completed her studies from University of Lahore. Her father, Anwar Elahi Khan, was in the Pakistan Air Force and her mother was an Aalima Fazila and a radio artist who played the character of Zohran Bibi in the famous radio play, Talqeen Shah. Her mother, Zakia Khanum, was the cousin sister of famous Urdu writer and playwright, Ashfaq Ahmad Khan. Naima Khan joined the industry in 1988.

Career
She started her acting on PTV. She appeared in dramas on PTV in 1987. She was noted for her roles in dramas Patt Jharr, Fareb, Nashaib, Zeeshan, Aik Qadam Par Manzil and Fishaar, Chandpur ka Chando. She also appeared in drama Adhoori Aurat along with Ayeza Khan and Faysal Qureshi and Khuda Aur Muhabbat with Imran Abbas and Sadia Khan. Since then she appeared in dramas Tum Mere Kya Ho, Saya-e-Dewar Bhi Nahi, Yaqeen Ka Safar and Yeh Dil Mera, Beti, Jo Tu Chahey.

Personal life
Naima is married to Rashid Ahmad Khan and has 2 daughters named Halima Khan and Hifza Khan. Her eldest daughter Rabia Khan passed away at the age of 5 to 6 years in 1993.

Filmography

Television

Telefilm

Film

References

External links
 
 
 

Living people
1972 births
20th-century Pakistani actresses
21st-century Pakistani actresses
Pakistani television actresses
Pakistani film actresses
Punjabi people